The Croatian Esperanto League is a society for those who speak Esperanto, Esperanto societies, and friends of Esperanto. Since its establishment in 1908, it deals with Esperanto in Croatia.

It hosted the 86th World Esperanto Congress in Zagreb in 2001.

References

External links 

 

Esperanto
Croatia
1908 establishments in Croatia
Organizations established in 1908